Shami-Damulla (died 1932) was a nickname for Sa‘id ibn Muhammad ibn ‘Abd al-Wahid ibn ‘Ali al-‘Asali al-Tarablusi al-Shami al-Dimashqi, an important figure in the development of Islamic fundamentalism in Soviet Central Asia. Among his followers was Ziyauddin Babakhan, the second mufti of the Spiritual Administration of the Muslims of Central Asia and Kazakhstan.

Before settling in Central Asia in 1919, Shami-Damulla travelled to Iran, Afghanistan and Kashmir. Originally from Cairo, he was an Al-Azhar educated scholar. Shami-Dulla seems to have been influenced by the movement during the 15-20 years that he lived in Xinjiang; the Salafist movement was particularly influential in Xinjiang where it was a counter to Sufism. He moved to Tashkent in 1919 with the support of the Russian consul in Kashgar.

References

Further reading
 Muminov, Ashirbek, "Fundamentalist Challenges to Local Islamic Traditions in Soviet and Post‐Soviet Central Asia" in Uyama, Tomohiko (ed.), Empire, Islam, and Politics in Central Eurasia. Slavic Eurasian studies, no. 14. Sapporo: Slavic Research Center, Hokkaido University, 2007.

1932 deaths
Islam in the Soviet Union
Year of birth missing
Al-Azhar University alumni
Egyptian Salafis
Islam in Uzbekistan